The 1997 Bulgarian Cup Final was played at the Vasil Levski National Stadium in Sofia on 28 May 1997, and was contested between the sides of CSKA Sofia and Levski Sofia. The match was won by CSKA Sofia.

Match

Details

See also
1996–97 A Group

Bulgarian Cup finals
PFC CSKA Sofia matches
PFC Levski Sofia matches
Cup Final